Gisèle Marie Joseph Ghislaine Gérarde Wibaut (born 19 August 1913 in Tournai, deceased 24 October 1978) was a Belgian resistance fighter and politician with the Christian Social Party.

Career 
During World War II, she fought in the Belgian resistance. After the War, she was awarded the 1940-45 Resistance Medal and the 1940-45 War Commemoration Medal. 

In the 1950s, she launched a career in politics, as a member of the Christian Social Party. From 1958 to 1968, she served as senator for Ath. From 1968 to 1976, she then served as a municipal councillor for the Tournai City Council. During her time as a city councillor, she also served as Alderwoman for Tournai, from 1970 until 1976. 

She died in October 1978, at the age of 65.

Personal life 
Her father, Edmond Wibaut, was a lawyer and politician with the Catholic Party, who previously serve as mayor of Tournai.

Sources 

 Het Belgisch parlement 1894-1969, P.Van Molle, Gand, Erasmus, 1969.
 Biografisch repertorium der Belgische parlementairen, senatoren en volksvertegenwoordigers 1830 tot 1.8.1965, R. Devuldere, Gand, R.U.G., thèse de licence en histoire inédite, 1965.
 Dico des femmes belges

Belgian resistance members
20th-century Belgian women politicians
20th-century Belgian politicians
Members of the Senate (Belgium)
1913 births
1978 deaths
Christian Social Party (Belgium, defunct) politicians
People from Tournai